The 2013 Malaysia Grand Prix Gold was the fifth grand prix gold and grand prix tournament of the 2013 BWF Grand Prix Gold and Grand Prix. The tournament was held in Juara Indoor Stadium, Kuala Lumpur, Malaysia from 30 April to 4 May 2013 and had a total purse of $120,000.

Men's singles

Seeds

  Lee Chong Wei (withdrew)
  Sony Dwi Kuncoro (withdrew)
  Daren Liew (quarter-final)
  Chong Wei Feng (second round)
  Tommy Sugiarto (withdrew)
  Simon Santoso (withdrew)
  Tanongsak Saensomboonsuk (third round)
  Dionysius Hayom Rumbaka (withdrew)
  Chen Yuekun (semi-final)
  Mohd Arif Abdul Latif (second round)
  Rajah Menuri Venkata Gurusaidutt (quarter-final)
  Alamsyah Yunus (champion)
  Andre Kurniawan Tedjono (first round)
  Suppanyu Avihingsanon (second round)
  Derek Wong Zi Liang (third round)
  Ashton Chen Yong Zhao (first round)

Finals

Top half

Section 1

Section 2

Section 3

Section 4

Bottom half

Section 5

Section 6

Section 7

Section 8

Women's singles

Seeds

  P. V. Sindhu (champion)
  Busanan Ongbumrungpan (semi-final)
  Sapsiree Taerattanachai (semi-final)
  Nichaon Jindapon (second round)
  Gu Juan (final)
  Sonia Cheah Su Ya (first round)
  Hera Desi (quarter-final)
  Tee Jing Yi (quarter-final)

Finals

Top half

Section 1

Section 2

Bottom half

Section 3

Section 4

Men's doubles

Seeds

  Koo Kien Keat / Tan Boon Heong (final)
  Hoon Thien How / Tan Wee Kiong (quarter-final)
  Goh V Shem / Lim Khim Wah (champion)
  Mohd Zakry Abdul Latif / Mohd Fairuzizuan Mohd Tazari (semi-final)
  Gan Teik Chai / Ong Soon Hock (second round)
  Markis Kido / Alvent Yulianto (semi-final)
  Yonathan Suryatama Dasuki / Hendra Aprida Gunawan (first round)
  Chooi Kah Ming / Ow Yao Han (second round)

Finals

Top half

Section 1

Section 2

Bottom half

Section 3

Section 4

Women's doubles

Seeds

  Pia Zebadiah Bernadeth / Rizki Amelia Pradipta (champion)
  Vivian Hoo Kah Mun / Woon Khe Wei (quarter-final)
  Goh Liu Ying / Lim Yin Loo (semi-final)
  Amelia Alicia Anscelly / Soong Fie Cho (second round)

Finals

Top half

Section 1

Section 2

Bottom half

Section 3

Section 4

Mixed doubles

Seeds

  Chan Peng Soon / Goh Liu Ying (semi-final)
  Markis Kido / Pia Zebadiah Bernadeth (second round)
  Danny Bawa Chrisnanta / Vanessa Neo (second round)
  Tan Aik Quan / Lai Pei Jing (final)

Finals

Top half

Section 1

Section 2

Bottom half

Section 3

Section 4

References

Malaysia Masters
Malaysia
Malaysia Grand Prix Gold
2010s in Kuala Lumpur